Michele Gelsi (born 7 September 1968 in Italy) is an Italian retired footballer.

References

Italian footballers
Living people
Association football midfielders
1968 births
Italy youth international footballers
ACF Fiorentina players
Parma Calcio 1913 players
Delfino Pescara 1936 players
A.C. Perugia Calcio players
Udinese Calcio players
Ravenna F.C. players
Ittihad FC players
U.S. Livorno 1915 players
S.S.D. Lucchese 1905 players
S.S. Arezzo players
Mantova 1911 players
Serie A players
Serie B players
Serie C players
Serie D players
Saudi Professional League players
Expatriate footballers in Saudi Arabia
Italian expatriate footballers
Italian expatriate sportspeople in Saudi Arabia